The progesterone receptor membrane components (PGRMCs) refer to the following two receptors:

 Progesterone receptor membrane component 1 (PGRMC1)
 Progesterone receptor membrane component 2 (PGRMC2)

See also
 Membrane progesterone receptor

References

Receptors